Gnorismoneura orientis is a species of moth in the family Tortricidae, described by Ivan Nikolayevich Filipjev in 1962. It is found in China (Heilongjiang, Liaoning, Shanxi and Shandong) and Russia (Ussuri).

The wingspan is about 16 mm.

References

Moths described in 1962
Archipini